The 1872 Amik (Antioch) earthquake occurred on April 3 with an epicenter within the Amik Valley in the Ottoman Empire. Earthquake had an estimated magnitude of  7.0–7.2 or  7.2 and maximum MSK 64 rating of XI (Catastrophic). Turkey and Syria were devastated by this earthquake, and the region lost at least 1,800 residents.

Tectonic setting
The Amik Valley lies along the Dead Sea Transform Fault system; predominantly strike-slip plate boundary between the African and Arabian tectonic plates. This ~1,000 km-long left-lateral transform fault connects the Red Sea spreading center in the south to the Maras Triple Junction in the north. At the Maras Triple Junction, the Dead Sea Transform Fault is one of two arms of the triple junction. Two other plate boundaries; the Cyprus arc, and East Anatolian Fault meet at this triple junction. Due to its location at an active and complex plate boundary, Antioch suffers from devastating earthquakes, including one in 115 AD that killed over 200,000 people.

Earthquake
The 1872 earthquake occurred along the Amanos Fault; a segment of the Dead Sea Transform. Its suggested epicenter is located just south of that of the 1822 Aleppo earthquake. Nicholas Ambraseys, a Greek seismologist, estimated the surface-wave magnitude at 7.2 . Estimates of the moment magnitude range from 7.0 to 7.2.

A paleoseismic study of the Hacıpaşa Fault, another segment of the Dead Sea Transform, did not find any evidence related to the 1872 quake suggesting the rupture did not extend south towards the Al-Ghab Plain. Studies on the Amanos Fault however, found evidence of a buried surface rupture that corresponded to the 1872 quake. Seismologists believe the surface rupture could have extended for 50 km along the fault. The researchers also discovered another surface rupture related to the 1405 magnitude 7.5 quake.

Impact

Extreme damage was reported around the now drained Lake Amik. The worst damage occurred in the Kumlu district in Hatay Province. The towns of Samandağ, Fatikli and Altınözü suffered great devastation. An estimated 1,800 people were killed. A maximum intensity of XI (Catastrophic) was assigned in Samandağ.

Approximately 40 seconds of extreme shaking was sufficient to destroy 1,960 of the 3,003 homes and kill 500 residents. A further 894 homes suffered serious damage. More than 5,000 commercial buildings were destroyed with only a few hundred left intact. A Greek cathedral and American Protestant church collapsed, killing four. City gates fell to the ground.

At least 38 villages outside the city were obliterated. In Suaidya, 2,150 homes collapsed and 300 people died. At least 170 were killed and 187 others were injured in Qaramut. The town lost 3,552 homes during the quake. Another 300 people died in Qilliq and the town was completely destroyed. The ground at Qilliq fissured and erupted yellow sand during liquefaction. Along the eastern slopes of the Amik Valley, the ground was displaced and surface ruptures ripped through the valley.

In Aleppo, an estimated 100 houses collapsed or were damaged. Seven residents lost their lives and three were injured. Many bridges also suffered damage. The earthquake was felt in Beirut, Rhodes, and Damascus. Shaking was not felt in Egypt, but over a wide area from Rhodes to Diyarbakir and from Konya to Gaza.

Along the coast of southern Turkey, a tsunami was reported, flooding the coast of Suaidiya. The tsunami reported inundated 2 km inland. In a 2003 study, tsunami experts from Tohoku University, Middle East Technical University and the National Observatory of Athens found a tsunami deposit that corresponded to 1872.

See also
List of earthquakes in the Levant
List of earthquakes in Turkey

References

1872 earthquakes
1872 in the Ottoman Empire
1872 natural disasters
1872 disasters in the Ottoman Empire
April 1872 events
History of Antioch
Earthquakes in Turkey
History of Hatay Province
Earthquakes in the Levant
Earthquakes in Syria